Journal of Mental Health is a bi-monthly journal established in March 1992 by Ray Hodgson (University of Wales College of Medicine, Centre of Applied Public Health Medicine, Cardiff).  In 2002, Til Wykes became the Executive Editor and has continued in that role until the present time.

For the first three years it was published quarterly, with five editions in 1995 and 1996 before settling on a bi-monthly issue cycle.

The first flyer for the journal stated in 1990 that "we have no intention of
adding to the multitude of lightly thumbed, tenuously relevant and uninteresting journals
accumulating in our libraries and on our bookshelves". Instead, they wanted to publish "work
which will have a direct impact upon our daily clinical practice, which is thought-provoking
and which challenges assumptions and methods in mental health".

The journal was mentioned 82 times in 2003 Cases for Change document published by National Institute for Mental Health in England.

References 

Bimonthly journals
Taylor & Francis academic journals
Publications established in 1992
Psychiatry journals
English-language journals